Samir Ziani (born 19 July 1990) is a French professional boxer who has held the European super-featherweight title since 2019.

Professional career
Ziani made his professional debut on 21 May 2010, scoring a four-round points decision (PTS) victory against Jerry Cagniac at the Salle Polyvalente des Ramiers in Blagnac, France.

He compiled a record of 8–0–1 (1 KO) before defeating Carel Sandon via ninth-round corner retirement (RTD) on 8 July 2011, capturing the vacant WBC International Silver lightweight title at the Piazza XX Settembre in Civitanova Marche, Italy. After retaining his title with a unanimous decision (UD) victory against Ruddy Encarnacion in January 2012, Ziani defeated Andrey Kudryavtsev via UD on 29 April at the Donbass Arena in Kyiv, Ukraine, capturing the vacant WBA International lightweight title.

Following four more victories, one by stoppage, he suffered the first defeat of his career on 7 December 2013 at the Gymnase Georges Racine in Clichy, France, losing by twelve-round UD against Samir Kasmi in a bid for the vacant European Union super-featherweight title.

He bounced back with a PTS victory against Sebastien Cornu in March 2014 before defeating Yoann Portallier on 6 June at the Salle Polyvalente des Ramiers, capturing the French super-featherweight title via UD over ten rounds. 

In his next fight he suffered the second defeat of his career, losing by UD over ten rounds in December 2014 against future IBF lightweight champion Richard Commey. Following the loss, Ziani went on a five-fight winning streak before facing Guillame Frenois for the vacant European super-featherweight title. The fight took place on 10 November 2016 at the Halle Georges Carpentier in Paris, France. All three judges scored the bout 115–113 in favour of Frenois, handing Ziani his third professional defeat.

After scoring two wins in April 2017, Ziani faced reigning French super-featherweight champion and former foe Samir Kasmi in a rematch on 18 May at the Cirque d'hiver in Paris. Ziani got his revenge over Kasmi with a ten-round majority decision (MD) victory to capture the French title for a second time. Two judges scored the bout 97–93 and 97–94 in favour of Ziani, while the third judge scored it a draw with 95–95.

Following three PTS victories, he made a second attempt at the vacant European super-featherweight title, facing Juli Giner on 2 February 2019 at the Palau Olímpic Vall d'Hebron in Barcelona, Spain. Ziani captured the vacant title with a sixth-round stoppage via RTD after Giner quit in his corner at the end of the round. After a PTS win against Wallington Orobio in a non-title fight in April, Ziani retained his European title with a UD victory against Faroukh Kourbanov on 26 October in Agen, France, with one judge scoring the bout 119–109 while the other two scored it 116–112. 

In the second defence of his title, Ziani faced Alex Dilmaghani on 5 September 2020 at the Production Park Studios in South Kirkby, England. After eleven closely contested rounds, Ziani was behind on the judges' scorecards. At the end of the eleventh, Ziani caused Dilmaghani to stagger across the ring after a sustained attack. The champion followed up with a three-punch combination which visibly hurt the challenger. In the twelfth and final round Ziani resumed his assault, forcing Dilmaghani to the canvas twice, with referee Giuseppe Quartarone ruling both as slips. Ziani, now landing punches with ease, caught Dilmaghani with a left hook to send the challenger to the canvas with 30 seconds of the fight remaining, scoring the first official knockdown of the fight. Dilmaghani made it back to his left before Quartarone reached the count of ten, only to be knocked into the ropes and onto the canvas for a second time. Dilmaghani again made it to his feet but Quartarone decided to call a halt to the contest, handing Ziani a twelfth-round technical knockout (TKO) victory. At the time of the stoppage, Ziani was behind on two of the judges' scorecards with 106–103 and 105–104, while the third judge scored in favour of Ziani with 105–104.

Ziani was booked to face Serif Gurdijeljac for the vacant IBF Inter-Continental super-featherweight title on 27 November 2021. He won the fight by a ninth-round technical knockout, which his second consecutive stoppage victory.

Professional boxing record

References

External links

Living people
1990 births
French male boxers
Super-featherweight boxers
Lightweight boxers
Southpaw boxers
European Boxing Union champions